Baal is a 1970 German television film directed by Volker Schlöndorff. It is based on the 1923 play Baal by Bertolt Brecht. The film disappeared after Helene Weigel, Brecht's widow, saw it on television and demanded that it no longer be shown. Ethan Hawke asked Schlöndorff about seeing the film at the Cannes Film Festival, but Schlöndorff replied that he did not know where it was. Eventually the film was discovered in rusty, unmarked cans filed under S. At that point, the film was restored. It was given its first home video release by Criterion in 2018. The film did not make the 1919 play a period piece, and some of the interiors featured intentionally over-the-top colors. It was the first film Dietrich Lohmann shot in color. Margarethe von Trotta was the first actor cast. Fassbinder joined for the title role after Schlöndorff's first choice was unavailable. Much of the supporting cast and crew came from Fassbinder's company, whom he did not want to be put out of work by his absence.

Plot and themes 
The film "explores the cult of the genius" as "an anti-heroic figure... chooses to be a social outcast and live on the fringe of bourgeois morality." In the film, "Volker Schlöndorff transposes Bertolt Brecht’s late-expressionist work to latter-day 1969", as [p]oet and anarchist Baal lives in an attic and reads his poems to cab drivers. At first feted and later rejected by bourgeois society, Baal roams through forests and along motorways, greedy for schnapps, cigarettes, women and men... After impregnating a young actress he soon comes to regard her as a millstone round his neck. He stabs a friend to death and dies alone."

Cast
 Rainer Werner Fassbinder Baal
 Sigi Graue: Ekart
 Margarethe von Trotta: Sophie
 Günther Neutze: Mech
 Miriam Spoerri: Emilie
 Marian Seidowsky: Johannes
 Irmgard Paulis: Johanna
 Carla Egerer: Carla Aulaulu
 Hanna Schygulla: Luise
 Wilmut Borell: Mjurk
 Rudolf Waldemar Brem: Holzfäller
 Andrea Brüdern
 Claudia Butenuth
 Johannes Buzalski: Penner
 András Fricsay
 Michael Gempart
 Irm Hermann: Hausherrin
 Michael Grasshoff
 Günther Kaufmann: Orgauer
 Jean Launay
 Sabine von Maydell
 Eva Pampuch: Frau im roten Kleid
 Herbert Rimbach
 Christine Schuberth: Striptiseuse Savitka
 Walter Sedlmayr
 Sigi Sommer: Holzfäller
 Ulf-Jürgen Wagner

Reference list

External links

Baal: The Nature of the Beast an essay by Dennis Lim at the Criterion Collection

1970 films
1970 television films
1970 drama films
German drama television films
West German films
1970s German-language films
German-language television shows
Films directed by Volker Schlöndorff
Films scored by Klaus Doldinger
Films based on works by Bertolt Brecht
German films based on plays
1970s German films
Das Erste original programming